Motonari Iguchi  (17 May 1908, in Tokyo – 29 September 1983, in Tokyo) was a Japanese pianist and educator.

Biography
He was influential in the post-war Japanese classical music world and his editions, published by Shunjūsha, are still the standard ones in that country. At the Tokyo Academy of Music Iguchi was a student of Leonid Kreuzer, a German piano instructor known for his powerful playing style, which Iguchi adopted. Later, Motonari Iguchi and his wife, Aiko, went on to become professors at the Tokyo Academy of Music.

References

1908 births
1983 deaths
20th-century classical musicians
20th-century classical pianists
20th-century Japanese male musicians
Japanese classical pianists
Japanese male classical pianists
Japanese music educators